The 2007 Claxton Shield was the 73rd anniversary of the event, it was held between 19 and 28 January 2007, at Baseball Park in Western Australia, the first to be held outside of Blacktown Baseball Stadium in New South Wales since 2002 when it was held at the Melbourne Ballpark. The 2007 Shield featured over 120 of Australia's best baseballers, including 45 professionals.

Teams

The 2007 Claxton Shield is being competed between 6 teams from around Australia.
2007 Claxton Shield team rosters

Australian Provincial,
New South Wales Patriots,
Perth Heat,
Queensland Rams,
South Australia,
Victoria Aces.

Match results

Game 1: 19 January 2007.

Game 2: 20 January 2007, at Hourglass Reserve, Rockingham.

Game 3: 20 January 2007.

Game 4: 20 January 2007.

Game 5: 21 January 2007, at Merlin Reserve, Mandurah.

Game 6: 21 January 2007.

Game 7: 21 January 2007.

Game 8: 22 January 2007.

Game 9: 22 January 2007.

Game 10: 22 January 2007.

Game 11: 23 January 2007.

Game 12: 23 January 2007.

Game 13: 23 January 2007.

Game 14: 24 January 2007.

Game 15: 24 January 2007.

Ladder - After Round Robin

Championship series

Game 16: 25 January 2007 - Minor Semi Final (3rd vs 4th)

Game 17: 25 January 2007 - Major Semi Final (1st vs 2nd)

Game 18: 26 January 2007 - Preliminary Final - Loser Game 17 Vs Winner Game 16

Game 19: 27 January 2007 - Grand Final - Winner Game 17 Vs Winner Game 18

Box score

Awards

Top Stats

All-Star Team

References

External links
Official Baseball Australia Website
Official 2007 Claxton Shield Website

 
Claxton Shield
January 2007 sports events in Australia
Claxton Shield